Giovanni Mezzani (born 28 December 1952) is an Italian former sport shooter who competed at the 1972, 1976, 1980 and the 1984 Summer Olympics.

References

1952 births
Living people
Italian male sport shooters
Olympic shooters of Italy
Shooters at the 1972 Summer Olympics
Shooters at the 1976 Summer Olympics
Shooters at the 1980 Summer Olympics
Shooters at the 1984 Summer Olympics